Itaewon Station is a station on Line 6 of the Seoul Subway. It takes its name from the neighborhood in which it is located in, also called Itaewon. There are many shops and restaurants for foreigners located close to Itaewon Station.

Station layout



Vicinity
Exit 1 : Hamilton Hotel
Exit 2 : Pakistani, Egyptian, Ecuadorian, Argentine Embassies in Korea
Exit 3 : Bogwang Elementary School
Exit 4 : Itaewon Market

Tourism
In January 2013, the Seoul Metropolitan Rapid Transit Corporation, which operated the line and the station until Seoul Metro took over in 2017, distributed free guidebooks from the station. These were printed in three languages: English, Japanese and Chinese (simplified and traditional), which features eight tours as well as recommendations for accommodations, restaurants and shopping centers.

On October 29, 2022, the immediate vicinity of the station was the site of a human crowd crush.

References

Metro stations in Yongsan District
Seoul Metropolitan Subway stations
Railway stations opened in 2001
Itaewon